The first season of Medium, an American television drama series, originally aired in the United States on NBC between January 3, 2005, and May 23, 2005. The show was created by Glenn Gordon Caron and based on the experiences of real-life medium Allison DuBois, a suburban wife and mother who uses her ability to communicate with the dead to assist law enforcement officials in criminal investigations. This is the first season to air on NBC.

The season introduced regular cast members Patricia Arquette, Maria Lark, Miguel Sandoval, Sofia Vassilieva, and Jake Weber. David Cubitt was a recurring star.

Cast and characters

Main cast 
 Patricia Arquette as Allison DuBois
 Miguel Sandoval as Manuel Devalos
 Sofia Vassilieva as Ariel DuBois
 Maria Lark as Bridgette DuBois
 Jake Weber as Joe DuBois

Recurring cast 
 Madison and Miranda Carabello as Marie DuBois
 Tina DiJoseph as Lynn DuNovi
 David Cubitt as Lee Scanlon
 Arliss Howard as Captain Kenneth Push
 Ryan Hurst as Allison's Half Brother Lucky

Episodes

Reception

Awards 
Patricia Arquette won the 2005 Primetime Emmy Award for Outstanding Lead Actress in a Drama Series.

References

External links 
 
 

Medium
Medium (TV series) seasons